"Gold Dust" is a song by Swedish electronic music duo Galantis. It was released on 23 February 2015 as the third single from their debut studio album Pharmacy (2015). It became available on April 4, 2015 upon pre-order of the LP. The track features uncredited production by Svidden and uncredited and heavily modified vocals from Vincent Pontare.

Track listings

Charts

References

2015 singles
2015 songs
Warner Music Group singles
Songs written by Cathy Dennis
Songs written by Christian Karlsson (DJ)
Songs written by Vincent Pontare
Big Beat Records (American record label) singles
Songs written by Style of Eye
Galantis songs
Songs written by Svidden